Jack Perry (31 December 191622 June 2006) and Douglas McKenzie (22 March 19184 August 2004) — were an entertainer duo from Melbourne who were known and billed professionally as the clown act, Zig and Zag. They appeared on Australian television from its inception in 1956 to 1999 beginning with Peters Fun Fair (1956–69). They featured on the annual Moomba parade (a community festival), and were regulars at annual charity events including the Good Friday Appeal for the Royal Children's Hospital. Perry was also an actor on television serials and presenter whilst McKenzie, was also a radio and television presenter and producer and former soldier. In March 1999 the duo permanently parted company after it was revealed that Jack Perry had been convicted in 1994 of indecent assault on his granddaughter.

History 

Zig and Zag were the clown duo of Jack Perry and Doug McKenzie; they began performing together in the 1950s in Melbourne. Before 1939 McKenzie was a junior announcer on Melbourne radio station, then known as 3XY. By 1952, he was voicing advertisements dressed as a clown with a young Bert Newton. This led to Zig and Zag regularly appearing on a Saturday morning children's show hosted by Frank Thring, alongside Newton and disc jockey, Stan Rofe. The clown duo first worked on their own show on 3XY's Tye's Radio Revue on Sundays and Peters Town Hall Show on Thursdays. In March 1956 they drove a toy car at their first Moomba parade and were crowd favourites at the annual festival.

On 10 November 1956 local TV station HSV7 broadcast the first episode of Peters Fun Fair, with the duo as its stars in the first children's session televised in Australia. They dressed in costumes advertising Peters Ice Cream, with the slogan, "the health food of a nation", and used the catchphrase, "No-o-o trouble". Zig and Zag added their theme song, "You and Me", to their act in the late 1950s. It was written by Tommy Steele and was originally performed by Steele and Jimmy Edwards in the 1958 London pantomime production of Rodgers and Hammerstein's Cinderella. Peters Fun Fair also featured Roy Lyons as Cousin Roy, and continued for 13 years.

To the TV generation of impressionable children, they are remembered as the slightly naughty duo who broke the King Street Bridge: after a structural failure in July 1962 they filmed a segment for their show where they dropped a coconut and pretended to crack the bridge, albeit accidentally. Zig and Zag also appeared on the annual HSV7 Good Friday Appeal, a telethon for Royal Children's Hospital, for more than forty years.

In February 1999, Zig and Zag were named as Moomba Monarchs, a festival that they had been associated with for 44 years, but they were stood down before being crowned in March. Revelations of Perry's indecent assaults on his granddaughter, from his 1994 trial, were broadcast on current affairs show Today Tonight. Since the duo's act was always aimed at children, it was irreparably ruined, and after the scandal, McKenzie never spoke to Perry again.

Members

Doug McKenzie

Douglas McKenzie (Zag) was born on 22 March 1918 in Gloucester, England. He later recalled that his father was "in heavy drama, graduated to producing, and finally wrote his own shows." His mother, Violet (née Viola Rene), was a soprano; the couple toured as a pantomime act and visited New Zealand before settling in Australia.

McKenzie enlisted in the Australian Army on 12 July 1940 during World War II and, seven months after the fall of Singapore, became a prisoner of war at Changi. As a corporal, McKenzie, and another prisoner, Bill West, annually ran a mock version of the Melbourne Cup in the prison by using bull frogs. In 1942 his frog, Greenbottle, won the mock cup trophy: made of cardboard, which McKenzie cherished upon return to Australia in 1945 (see photo opposite). He was discharged on 17 January 1946.

Whilst appearing on-air as Zag, he also produced many programs for HSV7, including Club 7, Hold Everything and Junior Jamboree. In 2002 McKenzie was the inaugural recipient of Variety's Heart of Show Business Award. Doug Christie, chairman of Variety, the children's charity, said that McKenzie was awarded for his long service to "Melbourne's entertainment industry and his commitment to children's charity". McKenzie died on 4 August 2004, aged 86.

Jack Perry

Jack Perry (Zig) was born on 31 December 1916 in London, England. During World War II he worked for Sutton Tool & Gauge, which was listed as "essential services" and so he did not enlist in the armed forces. After the war he turned to radio and, for 20 weeks, worked on 3UZ's Are You an Artist?. He later worked as an adult comedian at coffee lounges. By May 1958 he was married with three children.

Perry made many TV appearances outside his clown character, including as an actor in drama series such as Homicide, Division 4 (1970), Matlock Police (1971) and Prisoner (in nine episodes from 1979 to 1985). He had a supporting role in the feature film, Dimboola (1979). Perry appeared in the 1997 TV series, State Coroner. In November 2006, it was reported that Perry had died in April, aged around 88–89, with furniture marked "Heritage" and "Once belonged to Zig the Clown" being sold by the Salvation Army's South Melbourne store. His vintage Peters Ice Cream cylindrical hat was held at Australian Centre for the Moving Image museum, in Federation Square, it apparently dates back to the 1950s

Child abuse scandal

In March 1999 Zig and Zag stood down from the Moomba festival after they had been announced as Moomba Monarchs. It was disclosed that, in 1994, at Heidelberg Magistrates' Court, Perry had "pleaded guilty to seven counts of unlawful indecent assault against his granddaughter", Debra Clark, which had occurred "from the age of 12, between 1979 and 1981, while she lived with her grandparents". In 1999 other allegations of indecent assault of children also surfaced. Clark revealed that she had been indecently assaulted, by Perry, during an interview with Tracee Hutchison on television current affairs show, Today Tonight just before Perry (as Zig) with McKenzie (as Zag), were due to be crowned. The Moomba committee was devastated, and announced that there would be no replacement for the duo. Subsequent festivals had no monarch until 2010 when singer, Kate Ceberano, and music commentator, Molly Meldrum, were announced as Queen and King of Moomba respectively.

References

External links
 Zig and Zag's hats
 Photos:
 "Clowns Zig and Zag entertaining children at the 1964 Moomba parade" archived from the original on 23 September 2005, photo taken in March 1964, held at Co.As.It. – Italian Historical Society. Retrieved on 4 December 2018.
 "Zig @ Moomba" by Rennie Ellis, March 1971, held at State Library of Victoria
 "Blind Association. Glenferrie Road, Kooyong. Annual Fair" by Dennis Mayor, 28 March 1976, held at State Library of Victoria.
 

Australian comedy duos
Australian clowns
Australian television personalities
Television personalities from Melbourne